The Seattle U Redhawks women's basketball is the women's basketball team representing Seattle University. They compete in the Western Athletic Conference.

History
The Redhawks returned to NCAA play the same as the athletic program, joining the WAC in 2012. They won the regular season title in 2013, though they lost in the conference tournament title game, losing 67–64 to Idaho. They were invited to the WNIT, their first ever postseason appearance in history. They lost 68–51 in the 2013 Women's National Invitation Tournament to Saint Mary's in the First Round. The following year, in 2014, they lost again in the conference tournament title game 75–67 to Idaho.

In 2017, coach Suzy Barcomb, in her first year as Redhawks Head coach, led Seattle to a second-place finish in the WAC regular season.  They would fall to the regular season champs, New Mexico State, in the tournament championship final. Seattle qualified for an invitation to the WNIT, losing in the first round to Wyoming.

In 2018, Seattle earned their first WAC tournament championship, upsetting 2-seed Cal State Bakersfield as a 4-seed 57-54.  The win came with an automatic-bid to the NCAA Tournament, a first berth for the Redhawks women's program.

Postseason

NCAA Division I
The Redhawks have made the NCAA Division I women's basketball tournament once. Their record is 0–1.

WNIT
Seattle has appeared in the Women's National Invitation Tournament twice, going 0–2.

NAIA Division I
The Redhawks made one appearance in the NAIA Division I women's basketball tournament, with a combined record of 0–1.

References

External links